Baret is a surname. Notable people with the surname include:

Thomas Baret (died 1396), English MP for Oxford and spicer
Richard Baret (died 1401), English politician
William Baret, English MP for Gloucester

See also
Beret